Fawn Weaver (born 1976) is an American entrepreneur and author. She is currently the CEO of Grant Sidney Inc. and Uncle Nearest Premium Whiskey (which she founded in 2017), and is the founder of the Nearest Green Foundation. In March 2021, she was named to Endeavor's board of directors.

Career

Uncle Nearest Premium Whiskey 
In 2016, Weaver went to Tennessee to interview Nearest Green's descendants for a book project. Weaver's work helped reveal the history of Jack Daniel Distillery included Nearest Green as its first master distiller and mentor to a young Jack Daniel, inspiring her to found and launch the Nearest Green Distillery and the Uncle Nearest Premium Whiskey brand in 2017. This made Weaver the first African-American woman to head a major spirits brand, and also the first American spirit brand with an all-female executive team. In 2019, was the first African-American featured on the cover of American Whiskey magazine.

By 2018, the brand had expanded into all 50 states and 12 countries, and is now the best-selling African-American owned spirit ever. In September 2019, Uncle Nearest opened its first distillery, set on a 270-acre ranch in Shelbyville, Tennessee.

Weaver was named one of Food & Wine's Drinks Innovators of the Year in 2022, alongside Uncle Nearest master blender Victoria Eady Butler.

Before establishing the distillery, Weaver also founded the Nearest Green Foundation, which honors the legacy of Green with a scholarship program, a museum, a memorial park, Uncle Nearest Premium Whiskey and a book. The foundation also provides full college scholarships for any of Green's descendants to attend the school of their choice. She also helped create the Nearest & Jack Advancement Initiative, a joint venture between the foundation and Jack Daniel's. It includes the Nearest Green School of Distilling certification program at Motlow State Community College, a Leadership Acceleration Program that offers apprenticeships to African-Americans, and a business incubation program for black micro distillers.

In 2020, Weaver started the Black Business Booster program, to help ten Black-owned spirits companies with branding, distribution, and capital. In June 2021, Weaver and Uncle Nearest formed the $50 million Uncle Nearest Venture Fund to invest in minority-owned spirits companies.

Other work 
Fawn's career began in 1994, when she formed special events and public relations company FEW Entertainment. She worked as a restaurant and real estate executive through the early 2000s, before founding Grant Sidney Inc. in March 2010.

Weaver's first book, Happy Wives Club: One Woman's Worldwide Search for the Secrets of a Great Marriage was published in 2014 by Thomas Nelson, and debuted at #3 on the New York Times Nonfiction Paperback list. In 2015, she wrote The Argument-Free Marriage: 28 Days to Creating the Marriage You've Always Wanted with the Spouse You Already Have, which offers a 28-day plan for marital happiness using conflict management.

Weaver was named one of Time's "31 People Changing the South" in 2018. 

She was also an executive board member of Meet Each Need with Dignity and Slavery No More from January 2014 to December 2019. In March 2021, she was named to Endeavor's board of directors.

Personal life
Born in 1976 as Fawn Evette Wilson of African-American ancestry, she is the daughter of Motown Records songwriter and producer Frank Wilson. She has been married to Keith Weaver since 2003.

References

External links 
 Video: "The argument free marriage", with Fawn Weaver, July 2015, TEDxPortland via YouTube

Living people
1976 births
American relationships and sexuality writers
21st-century African-American people
20th-century African-American people
Women business executives